Gry Østvik (born 14 August 1963) is a former Norwegian biathlete and the first overall world cup winner for women.

World championships
She participated in the Norwegian team that won silver in the 3 × 5 km relay in 1984 and 1985.

World cup
Østvik won the overall Biathlon World Cup in the 1982/83 season. She finished 3rd in 1983/84.

References

1963 births
Living people
Norwegian female biathletes
Biathlon World Championships medalists
20th-century Norwegian women